was a Japanese politician of the Liberal Democratic Party, a member of the House of Representatives in the Diet (national legislature).

Biography 
A native of Niigata and graduate of Nihon University, he was elected for the first time in 2000 as an independent after an unsuccessful run in 1996.

References

External links 

  in Japanese.

1954 births
2018 deaths
People from Niigata (city)
Nihon University alumni
Members of the House of Representatives (Japan)
Liberal Democratic Party (Japan) politicians
21st-century Japanese politicians